The 2015 Motorcycle Grand Prix of the Americas was the second round of the 2015 Grand Prix motorcycle racing season. It was held at the Circuit of the Americas in Elroy on April 12, 2015.

In the MotoGP class, Repsol Honda's Marc Márquez took his first pole position of the season, and he ultimately went on to win the race, his third victory in as many years at the circuit. For the first time since the 2014 Aragon Grand Prix, three different manufacturers were represented on the podium; behind Márquez was Ducati's Andrea Dovizioso, who prevailed in a battle with Yamaha's Valentino Rossi, who finished in third place. In his 200th premier class start, local hero Nicky Hayden could only finish in thirteenth, while numerous riders retired from the race – Pol Espargaró collided with Scott Redding, with caused both riders to retire from the race, while Yonny Hernández, Mike Di Meglio and Stefan Bradl all crashed before the halfway mark. In the Moto3 race, a young Fabio Quartararo achieved his first ever World Championship podium in his second race in debut season.

Classification

MotoGP
The race start was delayed due to a water spillage at Turn 3, and ultimately started at 14:37 local time.

Moto2

Moto3

Championship standings after the race (MotoGP)
Below are the standings for the top five riders and constructors after round two has concluded.

Riders' Championship standings

Constructors' Championship standings

Teams' Championship standings

 Note: Only the top five positions are included for both sets of standings.

References

Americas
Grand Prix of the Americas
Motorcycle Grand Prix of the Americas
Motorcycle
Motorcycle Grand Prix of the Americas